Alberta Street Pub is a music venue and restaurant in Portland, Oregon's King neighborhood, in the United States.

Description and history

Kevin Sandri became executive chef in 2013, when the pub reopened after a six-month renovation. The updated menu included duck Cubano, fried octopus, Korean-style pork ribs, and chickpea and porchetta sandwiches. Sandri and the restaurant launched brunch in June 2013, serving chile relleno with chorizo, crème brulee French toast, and "green eggs and lamb" with mint pistou. Sandri left in October 2013.

The restaurant screened U.S. presidential election results in 2016.

In her 2021 overview of "Where to Eat and Drink on Alberta", Eater Portland Brooke Jackson-Glidden wrote, "This cozy, laid-back bar is the place to be for Old Alberta swagger and a rotating menu of 21 draughts. The covered outdoor patio is a primo spot to kill a few hours, and the Alberta Street Pub is one of the few venues actually hosting shows on its socially distanced patio." During the COVID-19 pandemic, the bar offered limited indoor seating, as of April 2021. Eater Portland Jenni Moore said in 2021:

See also
 List of New American restaurants

References

External links

 
 Alberta Street Pub at Zomato

King, Portland, Oregon
Music venues in Portland, Oregon
New American restaurants in Portland, Oregon